The Chirikov criterion or Chirikov resonance-overlap criterion
was established by the Russian physicist Boris Chirikov.
Back in 1959, he published a seminal article,
where he introduced the very first physical criterion for the onset of chaotic motion in 
deterministic Hamiltonian systems. He then applied such a criterion to explain
puzzling experimental results on plasma confinement in magnetic bottles
obtained by Rodionov at the Kurchatov Institute.

Description
According to this criterion a deterministic trajectory will begin to move
between two nonlinear resonances in a chaotic and unpredictable manner, 
in the parameter range

Here  is the perturbation parameter,
while 

is the resonance-overlap parameter, given by the ratio of the
unperturbed resonance width in frequency

(often computed in the pendulum
approximation and proportional to the square-root of perturbation),
and the frequency difference 

between two unperturbed resonances. Since its introduction, the Chirikov criterion has become an important analytical tool for the determination of the chaos border.

See also
 Chirikov criterion at Scholarpedia
 Chirikov standard map and standard map
 Boris Chirikov and Boris Chirikov at Scholarpedia

References
 B.V.Chirikov, "Research concerning the theory of nonlinear resonance and stochasticity", Preprint N 267, Institute of Nuclear Physics, Novosibirsk (1969), (Engl. Trans., CERN Trans. 71-40 (1971))
 B.V.Chirikov, "A universal instability of many-dimensional oscillator systems", Phys. Rep. 52: 263 (1979)
 Springer link

References

External links
 website dedicated to Boris Chirikov
 Special Volume dedicated to 70th of Boris Chirikov: Physica D 131:1-4 vii (1999) and arXiv

Chaos theory
Chaotic maps